Arpine Arzumanyan (born 23 October 1988) is an Armenian former footballer who played as a forward. She has been a member of the Armenia women's national team.

See also
List of Armenia women's international footballers

References

1988 births
Living people
Women's association football forwards
Armenian women's footballers
Armenia women's international footballers